Yoshkar-Ola is the capital city of the Mari El Republic, Russia.

Yoshkar-Ola may also refer to:
Yoshkar-Ola Urban Okrug, a municipal formation which the city of republic significance of Yoshkar-Ola in the Mari El Republic, Russia is incorporated as
Yoshkar-Ola Airport, an airport in the Mari El Republic, Russia
2910 Yoshkar-Ola, a main-belt asteroid